The Sea Lady is a 2006 novel written by the English author Margaret Drabble.

References

 
 
 

2006 British novels
Novels by Margaret Drabble
Penguin Books books